The Middle Reaches of Boone Creek Rural Historic District in the Clark County, Kentucky and Fayette County, Kentucky is a historic district which was listed on the National Register of Historic Places in 1996.

It is a  area roughly bounded by U.S. Route 421 (Kentucky), Jones Nursery, Coombs Ferry, Sulpher Well Rds., and U.S. Route 25.  The listing included 38 contributing buildings, 97 contributing structures, and five contributing sites.

It includes three properties which were already separately listed on the National Register, all in Clark County:
Boot Hill Farm,
Dailey-Milton Holliday House, and
Captain Robert V. Bush House.

References

Historic districts on the National Register of Historic Places in Kentucky
National Register of Historic Places in Clark County, Kentucky
National Register of Historic Places in Fayette County, Kentucky
Federal architecture in Kentucky
Buildings and structures completed in 1820
Farms on the National Register of Historic Places in Kentucky